Meja is a Swedish composer, artist and singer born in 1969.

Meja may also refer to:
 Meja (album), a 1996 album by Meja

Geography
Meja, Allahabad district Meja Tehsil, a tehsil of Allahabad, India
Meja Road, a district of an eastern Allahabad, and a railway station in India
Meja Dam, on Kothari River Rajasthan
Meja, Kranj, a settlement in the Upper Carniola region of Slovenia
Meja, Kosovo, site of Meja massacre
Lago della Meja lake in the Province of Cuneo, Piedmont, Italy

People
Meja Mwangi (born 1948), Kenyan novelist
Daniel Meja, French ballet dancer

Acronyms
Methyl jasmonate or MeJA, volatile organic compound used in plant defense and many diverse developmental pathways such as seed germination
Military Extraterritorial Jurisdiction Act